{{Infobox Information appliance
| name = Motodext
| screenshot =
| manufacturer = Motorola
| type = Slider Smartphone
| os = Motoblur
| cpu = Qualcomm 32-bit RISC ARM 528 MHz
| storage = micro sd up to 32 gb
| memory =  256 MB ram
| display = 320 × 480 px, 2:3 aspect ratio, 262,144-color LCD
| input = Multi-touch display, headset controls, 3-axis accelerometer
| camera = 5.0 megapixels
| connectivity = Wi-Fi (802.11b/g), Bluetooth 2.0+EDR, USB 2.0 Quad band GSM 850 900 1800 1900 GPRS/EDGEHSDPA 850, 1900, 2100 also supports: 7.2 Mbps HSDPA
}}

The Motodext''' is a Google Android-based Internet-connected, multimedia GSM smartphone designed and marketed by Motorola. It has a physical keyboard, the touch screen renders a virtual keyboard when necessary. It is  Motorola's first android-based device that has a new user interface called Motoblur which was introduced with the phone. This phone will be marketed as Motocliq for US and Motodext for the rest of the world.

See also
Motoblur
Motocliq

Motorola smartphones